= Hillis Peak =

Summit in Oregon, United States

Coordinates: 42°31′35″N 123°06′36″W

Hillis Peak is a summit in the U.S. state of Oregon. The elevation is 3,261 feet (994 m).

Hillis Peak was named in the 1860s after William P. Hillis, a pioneer settler.
